Pretty Hard Cases is a Canadian police crime comedy-drama television series that premiered on CBC Television on February 3, 2021. Originally announced with the working title Lady Dicks, the series was created by Tassie Cameron and Sherry White. In March 2021, the series was renewed for a second season, which premiered on January 5, 2022. IMDb TV became official co-producer for the series' second season, with the second season released on IMDb TV on April 22, 2022. In June 2022, at CBC's upfronts announcement event, the show was renewed for a third season, with Amazon Freevee (formerly IMDb TV) still committed and on board to co-fund, co-produce and broadcast in the United States. Season 3 premiered on January 4, 2023 on CBC and CBC Gem in Canada, and will air later in 2023 on Freevee, likely in April again if the series follows the same release pattern as before with the second season.

The CBC announced in February 2023 that the show will end at the conclusion of the third season on March 8.

Premise
The series follows two detectives in their early 40s: Sam, an uptight and by-the-book guns and gangs detective, and Kelly, a streetwise narcotics detective. Both are ambitious and accomplished in their own way excelling at work while struggling with their personal lives. They drive one another crazy, but also appreciate each other's strengths, and somehow manage to work together.

Cast
 Meredith MacNeill as Det. Sam Wazowski
 Adrienne C. Moore as Det. Kelly Duff
 Karen Robinson as Unit Commander Edwina Shanks
 Tara Strong as Tiggy Sullivan (season 1)
 Dean McDermott as Det. Barry Hamm (season 1)
 Al Mukadam as Det. Taai Nazeer
 Percy Hynes White as Elliot Wazowski
 Katie Douglas as Jackie Sullivan
 Ronnie Rowe as Rick Gray (season 1)
 Kim Coates as Bill Misiano (season 1)
 Tricia Black as Det. Tara Swallows
 Miguel Rivas as Det. Dustin Chase
 Daren A. Herbert as DS Nathan Greene
 Laura de Carteret as Marley Briggs
 Ben Bass as DS Brad Michaels (season 2)
 Charlotte Sullivan as Adeline French (season 2)

Episodes

Series overview

Season 1 (2021)

Season 2 (2022)

Season 3 (2023)

Production

Development
On February 11, 2020, CBC, along with NBCUniversal International Studios, announced that it had given the series, then titled "Lady Dicks" a series order. It was also revealed that Tassie Cameron and Sherry White would act as co-showrunners with David Wellington would direct the first episode. The launch of production was delayed by the COVID-19 pandemic in Canada; during the summer, further, the racial protests associated with the murder of George Floyd in the United States and the death of Regis Korchinski-Paquet in Canada led Cameron and White to rewrite some of their scripts.

Casting
On February 11, 2020, it was announced that the series would star Meredith MacNeill and Adrienne C. Moore. On September 8, 2020, CBC announced that Karen Robinson, Tara Strong, Dean McDermott, Al Mukadam, Percy Hynes White, Katie Douglas, and Ronnie Rowe would be joining the cast.

Filming
Filming was set to begin in early spring, but was delayed by the COVID-19 pandemic in Canada. In September 2020, filming was underway in the Toronto area.

International broadcast 
In the United States, the series premiered on September 10, 2021, on IMDb TV. In the UK, the series premiered on 19 January 2022 on Alibi.

References

External links

2020s Canadian comedy-drama television series
2021 Canadian television series debuts
CBC Television original programming
Canadian police procedural television series
Television shows filmed in Toronto
Television shows set in Toronto
2020s Canadian crime drama television series
Television series by Universal Television
2023 Canadian television series endings